The 14th Arabian Gulf Cup was held in Bahrain, in October/November 1998.

The tournament was won by Kuwait for the 9th time

Iraq continued to be banned from the tournament because of invasion of Kuwait in 1990.

Tournament

The teams played a single round-robin style competition. The team achieving first place in the overall standings was the tournament winner.

Standings

Results

Champions

References

1998
1998 in Asian football
1998
1998–99 in Qatari football
1998–99 in Bahraini football
1998–99 in Saudi Arabian football
1998–99 in Kuwaiti football
1998–99 in Omani football
1998–99 in Emirati football